The UK Singles Chart is one of many music charts compiled by the Official Charts Company that calculates the best-selling singles of the week in the United Kingdom. Before 2004, the chart was only based on the sales of physical singles. This list shows singles that peaked in the Top 10 of the UK Singles Chart during 1976, as well as singles which peaked in 1975 and 1977 but were in the top 10 in 1976. The entry date is when the single appeared in the top 10 for the first time (week ending, as published by the Official Charts Company, which is six days after the chart is announced).

One-hundred and thirty singles were in the top ten in 1976. Ten singles from 1975 remained in the top 10 for several weeks at the beginning of the year, while "Portsmouth" by Mike Oldfield, "Living Next Door to Alice" by Smokie and "Dr. Love" by Tina Charles were all released in 1976 but did not reach their peak until 1977. Twenty-four artists scored multiple entries in the top 10 in 1976. Billy Ocean, Dolly Parton, John Miles, Mike Oldfield and The Real Thing were among the many artists who achieved their first UK charting top 10 single in 1976.

The 1975 Christmas number-one, "Bohemian Rhapsody" by Queen, remained at number-one for the first four weeks of 1976. The first new number-one single of the year was "Mamma Mia" by ABBA. Overall, sixteen different singles peaked at number-one in 1976, with ABBA (3) having the most singles hit that position.

Background

Multiple entries
One-hundred and thirty singles charted in the top 10 in 1976, with one-hundred and seventeen singles reaching their peak this year.

Twenty-four artists scored multiple entries in the top 10 in 1976. ABBA and The Stylistics shared the record for most top 10 hits in 1976 with four hit singles each. "Mamma Mia", "Fernando" and "Dancing Queen" all reached number-one, while "Money, Money, Money" peaked at number three in December.

The Wurzels was one of a number of artists with two top-ten entries, including the number-one single "The Combine Harvester". 10cc, Bryan Ferry, Elton John, Mike Oldfield and Wings were among the other artists who had multiple top 10 entries in 1976.

Chart debuts
Fifty artists achieved their first top 10 single in 1976, either as a lead or featured artist. Gallagher and Lyle, The Manhattans, Mike Oldfield, The Real Thing, Sailor and The Wurzels all had another entry in their breakthrough year.

The following table (collapsed on desktop site) does not include acts who had previously charted as part of a group and secured their first top 10 solo single.

Notes
Dr. Hook had previously charted under the name Dr. Hook & the Medicine Show but their name was shortened in 1975. Ray Parker Jr. wrote "You See the Trouble with Me" and appeared alongside Barry White on the US single release, however he is not credited by the Official Charts Company for the UK release. His first and only official top 10 single would not come until the Ghostbusters theme song reached number 2 in 1984.

The Miracles had their first top 10 single - "Love Machine" - since the departure of Smokey Robinson, who had been replaced by Billy Griffin. They had been known as Smokey Robinson and the Miracles for their previous two top 10 entries. Geoff Love charted under the pseudonym Manuel and the Music of the Mountains in 1976, a moniker he had used since the late 1950s. He had debuted with two singles in 1960 using his own name.

David Ruffin was a member of The Temptations in their early days (1964-1968) but this was prior to the group making their top 10 debut with "I'm Gonna Make You Love Me" in 1969. Peter Frampton also started off in bands, scoring chart hits with both The Herd and Humble Pie in the late 1960s. "Show Me the Way" was his debut top 10 entry as a solo artist.

Jonathan King recorded the song "It Only Takes a Minute" as 100 Ton and a Feather. His chart debut had been "Everyone's Gone to the Moon", a number 4 hit in 1965. Tina Charles was in the line-up of 5000 Volts until this year; the group had one top 10 single, "I'm on Fire", in 1975 before her departure as she launched her solo career.

Johnny Wakelin's first release in 1975, "Black Superman (Muhammed Ali)", was billed as Johnny Wakelin and the Kinshasa Band.

Songs from films
The only song from a film to enter the top 10 in 1976 was "Theme from "Mahogany" (Do You Know Where You're Going To)" (from Mahogany).

Best-selling singles
Brotherhood of Man had the best-selling single of the year with "Save Your Kisses for Me". The song spent ten weeks in the top 10 (including six weeks at number one), sold over 1.006 million copies and was certified platinum by the BPI. "Don't Go Breaking My Heart" by Elton John & Kiki Dee came in second place. Pussycat's "Mississippi", "Dancing Queen" from ABBA and "A Little Bit More" by Dr. Hook made up the top five. Songs by Chicago, ABBA ("Fernando"), Tina Charles, Demis Roussos and The Four Seasons were also in the top ten best-selling singles of the year.

Top-ten singles
Key

Entries by artist

The following table shows artists who achieved two or more top 10 entries in 1976, including singles that reached their peak in 1975 or 1977. The figures include both main artists and featured artists, while appearances on ensemble charity records are also counted for each artist. The total number of weeks an artist spent in the top ten in 1976 is also shown.

Notes

 "Portsmouth" reached its peak of number three on 8 January 1977 (week ending).
 "Let's Twist Again" originally peaked at number 2 upon its initial release in 1962. "The Twist" originally peaked outside the top 10 at number 49 on its initial release in 1960. It reached the top 20 for the first time in 1962, peaking at number 14. In 1975, the two songs were re-issued together as a double A-sided single.
 "Happy to Be On An Island in the Sun" re-entered the top 10 at number 10 on 17 January 1976 (week ending).
 "Itchycoo Park" originally peaked at number 3 on its initial release in 1967.
 "No Regrets" re-entered the top 10 at number 8 on 28 February 1976 (week ending).
"Save Your Kisses for Me" was the United Kingdom's winning entry at the Eurovision Song Contest in 1976.
 "Leader of the Pack" originally peaked outside the top 10 at number 11 on its initial release in 1965. It first reached the top 10 in 1972, peaking at number 3.
 Dr. Hook & the Medicine Show shortened their name to Dr. Hook in 1975 and reached the top 10 for the first time under this moniker in 1976.
 "Jeans On" was used as a jingle for Brutus Jeans adverts in 1976 before being turned into a full-length song.
 "You Should Be Dancing" re-entered the top 10 at number 5 on 11 September 1976 (week ending).
 "Sailing" originally peaked at number-one upon its release in 1975. It re-entered the top 10 at number 7 on 2 October 1976 (week ending) for 6 weeks, as a result of it being utilized as the theme song for Sailor, a documentary series on HMS Ark Royal, which BBC1 aired for ten weeks from 5 August 1976.
 "Substitute" originally peaked at number 5 on its initial release in 1966. It was re-released as a single in 1976 after being featured on the commercially successful compilation album The Story of The Who.
 "Lean on Me" re-entered the top 10 at number 10 on 8 January 1977 (week ending).
 Figure includes single that peaked in 1975.
 Figure includes single that peaked in 1977.

See also
1976 in British music
List of number-one singles from the 1970s (UK)

References
General

Specific

External links
1976 singles chart archive at the Official Charts Company (click on relevant week)

Top 10 singles
United Kingdom
1976